The National Library of Rwanda Inkoranyabitabo in Kinyarwanda was founded in 1989 by the presidential order no 132/06 of March the 10th 1989 as a direction in Ministry of High Education and Research. It is located in the city of Kigali. It has a printed and digital collections. The Rwanda Archives and Library Services Authority was established by the Law No 12/2014 of 09/05/2014.

See also 
 National Archives of Rwanda
 List of national libraries

References

Bibliography
  

Rwanda
Libraries in Rwanda
Kigali
1989 establishments in Rwanda
Libraries established in 1989